The Humdinger is the third studio album by American hip hop quintet Nappy Roots from Kentucky. It was released on August 5, 2008 under Nappy Roots Entertainment Group record label's partnership with Fontana Distribution. Recording sessions took place at Treesound Studios in Atlanta and at the Kitchen Studios. Production was handled by Sol Messiah, James "Groove" Chambers, 3 Kingz, Big Al, Count Justice, Joe Hop, Kevin Freeman, N.A., Vision and Willy Will. The album features guest appearances from Slick & Rose, Anthony Hamilton, Greg Nice, James "Groove" Chambers and Tracy Hill.

The album peaked at number 73 on the Billboard 200 and at number 13 on the Top R&B/Hip-Hop Albums in the United States. Its lead single, "Good Day", made it to #54 on the Hot R&B/Hip-Hop Songs and the R&B/Hip-Hop Airplay, and was certified gold by the Recording Industry Association of America on September 21, 2018.

Album information 

The Humdinger was set to be released in 2005, a follow-up to the group's 2003 album Wooden Leather, but was delayed several times. It is the group's first studio album not to feature R. Prophet, who left the group to pursue a solo career, and it is also their first studio album released via their own independent record label Nappy Roots Entertainment Group.

Several tracks of the album, including "Good Day", were previously featured on their 2007 mixtape Innerstate Music. The song "Tinted Up" was previously presented on their 2008 mixtape Cookout Muzik.

Track listing

Personnel

Technical
 Slavic Livins– mixing
Joel "HoP" Hopper-Engineer and Mix

References

External links
Nappy Roots – The Humdinger at AllMusic
Nappy Roots – The Humdinger at Discogs

2008 albums
Nappy Roots albums